Muthu Krishna Mani is an Indian nephrologist and a pioneer of nephrology in India. He is a former chief of nephrology department at Apollo Hospital, Chennai and is best known for treating Jayaprakash Narayan when the latter developed a renal disorder. The Government of India awarded him the Padma Bhushan, the third highest civilian award, in 1991. He is also a recipient of the Dhanvantari Award (2011) and the Ravindranath Tagore Award. He has published over 125 medical papers and the orations delivered by him include the 2018 Dr. Pathros Matthai Memorial Oration of the Indian Society of Nephrology (southern chapter - ISNSC).

Bibliography

Notes

References

External links
 

Recipients of the Padma Bhushan in medicine
Year of birth missing
Indian nephrologists
Indian medical writers
People from Tamil Nadu